Raymond of Antioch may refer to:

Raymond of Poitiers, prince of Antioch from 1136 to 1149
Raymond IV, Count of Tripoli, regent of Antioch from 1193 to 1194
Raymond of Antioch (died 1213), heir of Antioch from 1201 until 1213
Raymond-Roupen, prince of Antioch from 1216 to 1219